Stanislav Kuzmin (born June 24, 1986) is a Kazakh swimmer, who specialized in sprint freestyle and butterfly events. He represented his nation Kazakhstan at the 2008 Summer Olympics, and has won a career total of eight medals (four golds, two silver, and two bronze) in a major international competition, spanning two editions of the Asian Indoor Games, and the 2010 Asian Games in Guangzhou, China, as a member of the medley relay team. Kuzmin also spent his college sports career in the United States as a member of the Drury Panthers swimming and diving team under head coach Brian Reynolds, while pursuing his sports management studies at Drury University in Springfield, Missouri.

Kuzmin competed for the Kazakh swimming squad in the men's 50 m freestyle at the 2008 Summer Olympics in Beijing. Leading up to the Games, he stormed home the field with a winning time of 23.09 to eclipse the FINA B-cut by just a fingertip of a second (0.04) at the Kazakhstan Open Championships in Almaty. Swimming in heat seven, Kuzmin dipped under the 23-second barrier to take the fifth spot in a scorching lifetime best of 22.91, but missed the semifinals with a forty-eighth overall placement from a roster of ninety-seven entrants.

At the 2010 Asian Games in Guangzhou, Kuzmin produced a magnificent freestyle anchor of 49.71 to deliver the Kazakh foursome of Stanislav Osinsky, 2004 Olympic fifth-place finalist Vladislav Polyakov, and newcomer Fedor Shkilyov a bronze-medal time in the 4 × 100 m medley relay, posting a textile best of 3:40.55.

References

External links
Profile – Kazakhstan Swimming Federation
Player Bio – Drury Panthers
NBC 2008 Olympics profile

1986 births
Living people
Kazakhstani male butterfly swimmers
Olympic swimmers of Kazakhstan
Swimmers at the 2008 Summer Olympics
Swimmers at the 2006 Asian Games
Swimmers at the 2010 Asian Games
Asian Games medalists in swimming
Kazakhstani male freestyle swimmers
People from Kostanay Region
Drury Panthers men's swimmers
Asian Games bronze medalists for Kazakhstan
Medalists at the 2010 Asian Games
21st-century Kazakhstani people